Boldog may refer to:

Places
 Boldog, Hungary, Hungarian municipality
 Boldog, Slovakia, Slovakian village
 Delüün Boldog, birthplace of Genghis Khan

People
 István Boldog, Hungarian politician

Other uses